Lafmejan or Lafmajan, also rendered as Lafmujan or Lafmudzhan, may refer to:
 Bala Mahalleh-ye Lafmejan
 Pain Mahalleh-ye Lafmejan
 Lafmejan Rural District